Palaquium hornei is a tree in the family Sapotaceae.

Description
Its timber is locally harvested.

Distribution and habitat
Palaquium hornei is endemic to Fiji, where it is confined to the islands of Viti Levu, Vanua Levu and Kadavu.

References

hornei
Endemic flora of Fiji
Plants described in 1883
Taxa named by John Gilbert Baker